Guanglan Road is a station on Line 2 of the Shanghai Metro. The station is located east of the intersection between Zuchongzhi Road and Guanglan Road, and has four exits.

The station has three tracks, an island platform, and a side platform. Trains heading to East Xujing use the island platform and trains heading to Pudong International Airport use the side platform.

The station connects to the Zhangjiang Tram .

History 

By 2008, the Line 2 terminated at the  station. On 24 February 2010, the line was expanded from this station through the  station to the Guanglan Road station.

Facilities 
The station is located in Shanghai's Pudong New Area, along Zuchongzhi Road, near an intersection with Guanglan Road and Shenjiang Road.

Exits
Shaped like an oblong rectangle, the station has 4 exits, 1-5 (There is no Exit 3)
Exits 1 and 5 are located north of Zuchongzhi Road, with exit 1 further to the east than exit 5.
Exits 2 and 4 are located south of the road, with exit 4 further to the west than exit 2. Exit 4 is located south of the Pudongxingqu Zhangjiangzhen Zhongxin Elementary School, which occupies the area above the western section of the station. The eastern section of the station is located beneath a Shanghai Tianxiang Garment Manufacturing Ltd. Co. building. The station is served by bus routes 615, 636, and 990.

Service 
Along Line 2, the station is located between the Jinke Road station and the Tangzhen station. The train operates from 5:30 to 22:45 westbound and from 6:30 to 21:00 eastbound. On weekdays, trains leave the station approximately every 3 minutes and 30 seconds during peak hours and every four to ten minutes during non-peak hours. Peak hours are defined as from 7:30 to 9:30 and 17:00 to 19:00 on Monday through Thursday, as well as 7:00 to 9:00 and 12:50 to 20:30 on Friday. On weekends, trains leave the stations every 4 minutes and 5 seconds from 8:00 to 20:30, and every five to ten minutes during other times. Before 2019, the station was a transfer station for passengers traveling to or from points east on Line 2. Originally, Line 2 used 4-carriage trains heading east of Guanglan Road while 8-carriage trains were used heading west. In April 2019, short-running on the eastern portion of the line became rush hour only and mainline services were extended to Pudong Airport with 8-carriage trains.

References 

Line 2, Shanghai Metro
Shanghai Metro stations in Pudong
Railway stations in China opened in 2010
Railway stations in Shanghai